George Washington Davies (February 22, 1868 – September 22, 1906), was an American professional baseball player who played pitcher in the Major Leagues in -. He was born in Portage, Wisconsin, and played for the Cleveland Spiders, New York Giants, and Milwaukee Brewers. He died in Waterloo, Wisconsin, aged 38.

External links

1868 births
1906 deaths
Major League Baseball pitchers
Cleveland Spiders players
Milwaukee Brewers (AA) players
New York Giants (NL) players
19th-century baseball players
Milwaukee Brewers (minor league) players
Milwaukee Creams players
People from Portage, Wisconsin
Baseball players from Wisconsin
Wisconsin Badgers baseball players
Burials in Wisconsin